Punarnavi Bhupalam is an Indian actress who works in Telugu films and television. She was nominated for Filmfare Award as Best Supporting Actress – Telugu for her debut in Uyyala Jampala (2013).

Early life
Punarnavi Bhupalam was born in Tenali, Andhra Pradesh to Bhagya Lakshmi and Nagesh Kumar. Her great-grandfather Bhupalam Subbarayudu Setty was a freedom fighter from Jammalamadugu, Cuddapah district, Andhra Pradesh. Her family is settled in Hyderabad. Bhupalam did her schooling in Vijayawada and Hyderabad, and graduated in psychology and journalism.

Career
Bhupalam started as a theatre student and ended up in movies at the age 17, her debut as a supporting role in the movie Uyyala Jampala was nominated for Filmfare Award for Best Supporting Actress – Telugu.

Filmography

Television

Web series

References

External links

Living people
Actresses from Andhra Pradesh
Actresses in Telugu cinema
Indian women comedians
People from Tenali
1996 births

Indian film actresses
Indian actresses